Raduň is a municipality and village in Opava District in the Moravian-Silesian Region of the Czech Republic. It has about 1,200 inhabitants.

History
The first written mention of Raduň is from 1320.

References

External links

Villages in Opava District